Miller's line was a passenger railway line in Russia from 1873 to 1886, run by the Finnish State Railways. The line ran from Beloostrov to Sestroretsk, and was the site of the world's first functional electric railway.

Organisation 
The private organisation Societies of the Sestroretsk Railway was established to control the railway, headed by Collegiate Assessor Moritz von-Dezen and Titular counsellor Michael Ivanovich Miller. It had been built for the military as the Sestroretsk spur line.

There were plans to build a station 3 versts (approximately 3 kilometres) from Sestroretsk, on the bank of Sestroretsk Bay, and also an additional branch line to the Tarhovsky pier, where an operational station already existed.

Experiments with electrification 

In 1875, on an area between Miller's pier and Sestroretsk rail station, the engineer Fyodor Pirotsky experimented on the adaptation of rail transport to be driven by an electrogalvanic cell. These experiments later led to a patent "For an electric way of transfer of forces on rail and other conductors", that is, for the creation of the first electric tram.

The experimental area consisted of a site with an extent of 3½ versts (3.73 km), which passed along the sand of beach for a large part of its length, with rail cars travelling distances of over one kilometre.

The system used the rails as conductors for electricity transmission; one rail carried the direct current, and the second rail functioned as a return wire. After establishing the necessary connections on the joints between the rails, the transmission of electricity was successfully carried out.

Pirotsky stated that current leakage to the earth was not appreciable, and the transfer efficiency was calculated to be acceptable. Expenses for the adaptation of existing railways to electricity transmission were determined to be insignificant – from 50 to 100 roubles per verst.

Closure 
In 1877, the line operated four pairs of trains. They primarily served residents during the summer period, while in the winter they were only used by officials.

The recorded volume of patronage was very insignificant because of a disputed tariff policy of Finnish railways, and ultimately the Miller's pier station was left idle. As a result, the operators appeared to be in a disastrous financial position, and the majority of the proposed plans were left incomplete.
 
By the mid-1880s, the Society of the Sestroretsk railway was definitively ruined, and on January 1, 1886, the railway was closed.

See also
Sestroretsk spur line

References 

Railway lines in Finland
Railway lines in Russia
Electric railways in Finland
Electric railways in Russia
Rail lines by company
Railway lines opened in 1873
Railway lines closed in 1886
1873 establishments in the Russian Empire
5 ft gauge railways in Finland